The 29th Massachusetts General Court, consisting of the Massachusetts Senate and the Massachusetts House of Representatives, met in 1808 and 1809 during the governorship of Levi Lincoln Sr. Harrison Gray Otis served as president of the Senate and Timothy Bigelow served as speaker of the House. In 1808, the state legislature elected James Lloyd as the Class 1 United States Senator from Massachusetts to succeed John Quincy Adams following his resignation on June 8, 1808.

Senators

Representatives

See also
 10th United States Congress
 11th United States Congress
 List of Massachusetts General Courts

References

External links
 . (Includes data for state senate and house elections in 1808)
 
 
 
 
 
 

Political history of Massachusetts
Massachusetts legislative sessions
massachusetts
1808 in Massachusetts
massachusetts
1809 in Massachusetts